Satu Pusila (born 25 April 1962) is a Finnish sport shooter. She competed in trap shooting events at the 1996 and 2000 Summer Olympics.

Olympic results

See also
Trap World Champions
Trap European Champions

References

External links
 

1962 births
Living people
Trap and double trap shooters
Finnish female sport shooters
Shooters at the 1996 Summer Olympics
Shooters at the 2000 Summer Olympics
Olympic shooters of Finland
People from Orimattila
Sportspeople from Päijät-Häme